Cyrtandromoea is a genus of flowering plants belonging to the family Phrymaceae. For a considerable time, the family placement of the genus remained uncertain; it was placed in either Gesneriaceae or Scrophulariaceae. A molecular phylogenetic study published in 2019 showed that it belonged in Phrymaceae.

Its native range is Southern Central China to Indo-China and Western Malesia.

Species:
Cyrtandromoea angustifolia 
Cyrtandromoea decurrens 
Cyrtandromoea dispar 
Cyrtandromoea grandiflora 
Cyrtandromoea grandis 
Cyrtandromoea megaphylla 
Cyrtandromoea miqueliana 
Cyrtandromoea nicobarica 
Cyrtandromoea pterocaulis 
Cyrtandromoea subintegra 
Cyrtandromoea subsessilis 
Cyrtandromoea sumatrana

References

Scrophulariaceae
Scrophulariaceae genera